Zweyer is a German surname. It may refer to the following people:

 Jan Zweyer, German author
 Zweyer von Evenbach, Barons in the Countship Hauenstein
 Zweyer von Unteralpfen, feudal Lords  in the Countship Hauenstein
 General Zweyer of Uri, fictional character from the novel Addrich im Moos by Heinrich Zschokke

German-language surnames